Llorgozana (Logrezana in Spanish) is one of 12 parishes (administrative divisions) in Carreño, a municipality within the province and autonomous community of Asturias, in northern Spain.

The postal code is 33438.

Culture
 Castle of la Barrera en Castiello
 Palace of los Carreño-Alas
 Church of Santa María la Real de Llorgozana
 Chapel of del Espíritu Santu  in Castiello
 House of Busto Valdés
 House of Fernández Porley in El Fundial
 House of Muñiz de Pola o de Solís Carreño in Posada
 Edifice of les Escueles de Llorgozana

Villages and hamlets
 Cabovilla
 Castiello
 El Cantu
 El Cardusu
 El Fundial
 El Lloral
 El Monte
 El Pedregal
 Fontefría
 L'Arena
 La Barca
 La Barrera
 La Cavada
 La Granda
 La Llegua
 La Machina
 La Menudina
 Llantero
 Los Tayos
 Posada
 Sebades

References 

Parishes in Carreño